Assiminea vulgaris is a species of  minute salt marsh snail with an operculum, an aquatic gastropod mollusk in the family Assimineidae.

Description
The dental formula of the stenoglossan radula of Assiminea vulgaris is 1 + 1 + 1 + 1 + 1 + 1 + 1. The central tooth has five cusps, and three denticles on each side, below. The inner lateral tooth has six cusps and the outer lateral tooth five. The marginal teeth show 15 pectinate cusps.

References

 Powell A. W. B., New Zealand Mollusca, William Collins Publishers Ltd, Auckland, New Zealand 1979 

Assimineidae
Gastropods of New Zealand
Gastropods described in 1905